Khotylyovo is a rural locality (a selo) in Bryansky District, Bryansk Oblast, Russia. The population was 303 as of 2013. There are 12 streets.

Geography 
Khotylyovo is located 7 km north of Glinishchevo (the district's administrative centre) by road. Stayevo is the nearest rural locality.

References 

Rural localities in Bryansky District